WantedList was an adult DVD-by-mail service established in 1999, offering flat-rate subscription-based rentals by mail to customers in the United States. It was based in Van Nuys, Los Angeles, California with an additional distribution center in New Jersey.

WantedList had approximately 25,000 subscribers and 20,000 adult DVD titles in stock. It was founded by Anh Tran and Danny Ting, two Asian Americans who were formerly consultants for Arthur Andersen.

Acquisitions
WantedList acquired competitor websites FlickSmart and RentFlixxx in Q4 of 2004. Shortly thereafter they acquired additional competitor websites Video Takeout and Flick Central (both holdings of VTO Enterprises Inc. founded by Dennis Consorte). This last acquisition gave the company their East Coast distribution point in New Jersey to support the West Coast center in California.

Competition
WantedList is one of a number of websites in the pornographic video marketplace that mimic the Netflix model of subscription-based rentals by mail. Other sites include: DVD Empire, XRentDVD, Intelliflix (closed), Intimatedvd, AdultDVDCentral.com, Rentdvdxxx.com, URentDVDs and SugarDVD

Awards
WantedList won the AVN Award for Best Retail Website in 2005, 2006 (tied with Adult DVD Empire) and 2007 and the Xbiz award for Web Retailer of the Year in 2007.

WantedList is a winner of the 2010 Best Adult DVD Rental award for best online porn DVD movie rental service.

Notes

External links
 
 Skin City Wired Magazine November 2005.
 Sex and Two Single Guys AsianWeek October 2003.
 WantedList.com Buying FlickSmart and Rentflixxx AVN November 2004.
 WantedList.com Acquires Video Takeout and Flick Central AVN December 2004.
 AVN Awards
 XBiz Awards

Video rental services
Entertainment companies based in California
Companies based in Los Angeles
American companies established in 1999
Entertainment companies established in 1999
1999 establishments in California
Adult_entertainment_companies